Quincy is a small unincorporated community in northwestern Hickory County, Missouri, United States. It is located on Route 83, north of U.S. Route 54. A post office and a few homes are located there.

Quincy was platted in 1848. The community most likely was named after U.S. President John Quincy Adams. A post office called Quincy has been in operation since 1850.

Quincy Public Hall was listed on the National Register of Historic Places in 1995.

Notable person
 Elijah S. Grammer, US Senator from Washington state

References

Unincorporated communities in Hickory County, Missouri
Unincorporated communities in Missouri